Curvature is a 2017 American science fiction mystery thriller film directed by Diego Hallivis and starring Lyndsy Fonseca and Linda Hamilton.

Cast
Lyndsy Fonseca as Helen
Glenn Morshower as Tomas
Linda Hamilton as Florence
Zach Avery as Alex
Alex Lanipekun as Kraviz
Noah Bean as Wells

Reception
The film has a 47% rating on Rotten Tomatoes.

References

External links
 
 

2017 films
American science fiction thriller films
American mystery thriller films
2010s English-language films
2010s American films